Ongp'yŏng station is a railway station in Ongp'yŏng-dong, greater Munch'ŏn city, Kangwŏn province, North Korea, on the Kangwŏn Line of the Korean State Railway; it is also the starting point of the Munch'ŏn Port Line to Koam.

History
Originally called Munch'ŏn station (Chosŏn'gŭl: 문천역; Hanja: 文川駅), the station, along with the rest of the Ongp'yŏng–Kowŏn–Kŭmya section of the former Hamgyŏng Line, was opened by the Chosen Government Railway on 21 July 1916, while the Munch'ŏn Port Line was opened on 17 December 1943 by the Chosen Anthracite Company as a privately owned railway. This line, like all other railway lines in North Korea, was nationalised after the Second World War, becoming part of the Korean State Railway.; the station received its current name after that.

References

Railway stations in North Korea